The International Cup of Nice is an annual international figure skating competition usually held in October or November in Nice, France. It was continuously held from 1995 to 2017 (except 2005) for 22 years. The event returned in 2021, beginning its first iteration under a new name, the Trophée Métropole Nice Côte d'Azur. Medals may be awarded in men's singles, ladies' singles, pair skating, and ice dancing on the senior, junior, and novice levels, although some events are not held in some years.

Senior medalists

Men

Ladies

Pairs

Ice dancing

Junior medalists

Men

Women

Pairs

Ice dance

References

External links
 Official site 
 2004 results 

Figure skating competitions